Malvern City FC is a football (soccer) club in Kooyong, Victoria. The club was established in 1976. They play their home games at Sir Zelman Cowen Park opposite Kooyong Tennis Club.

First Team Squad
As of 6 September 2018

Board & Administration

Technical Staff

Notable players
  Connor Pain (2010-2011) Over 100 appearances in the A-League. Connor previously played for Melbourne Victory, the Central Coast Mariners and is currently playing for Western United FC. Connor is also a full international, having capped for Australia.

References

External links
 Home Page
 Facebook

Soccer clubs in Melbourne
Association football clubs established in 1976
1976 establishments in Australia
Sport in the City of Stonnington